Thanks to ABBA's victory the preceding year, Sweden hosted the Eurovision Song Contest 1975. Their entry was chosen in Melodifestivalen 1975, and the winner was last year's runner up, Lasse Berghagen, with the song "Jennie, Jennie", which he had written and composed himself.

Before Eurovision

Melodifestivalen 1975 
Melodifestivalen 1975 was the selection for the 16th song to represent Sweden at the Eurovision Song Contest. It was the 15th time that this system of picking a song had been used. 10 songwriters were selected by SVT for the competition. The final was held in the SVT Studios in Gothenburg on 15 February 1975, presented by Karin Falck and was broadcast on TV1 but was not broadcast on radio.

Voting

At Eurovision
At the ESC final in Stockholm, Berghagen performed 18th, and sang the song in English. This year, the 12 points voting system was for the first time in use. He did not receive any 12s (Sweden's highest score was 8 points from Norway and Turkey), but finished 8th (out of 19) with 72 points.

Voting

References

External links
TV broadcastings at SVT's open archive

1975
Countries in the Eurovision Song Contest 1975
1975
Eurovision
Eurovision